Kyle Davidson (born July 1, 1988) is a Canadian sports executive who currently serves as the general manager of the Chicago Blackhawks of the National Hockey League (NHL) since October 26, 2021.

Life

Davidson graduated with a bachelor's degree in Sports Administration (SPAD) from Laurentian University. After graduating in 2009, he began working for the Ottawa Senators (NHL) in their supporter relations department. The following year, Davidson became an intern with the Chicago Blackhawks as a video analyst. Between 2012 and 2018, he worked for the ice hockey organization's administration and held various positions, participating in two Stanley Cup wins in the 2012–13 and 2014–15 seasons. In 2018, he was appointed assistant to general manager Stan Bowman. The following year, Davidson was promoted to assistant general manager, and in October 2021 he took over on an interim basis after Bowman stepped down from his positions with the Blackhawks. On March 1, 2022, the Blackhawks removed the interim tag, and formally named him as their general manager.

Taking over in the midst of a very poor 2021–22 season, and with the Blackhawks having very limited talent in their development pipeline, Davidson opted to initiate a full rebuild of the roster. Controversially, this involved trading away or declining to retain much of the franchise's existing young talent. Davidson traded Alex DeBrincat to the Ottawa Senators and Kirby Dach to the Montreal Canadiens in deals based primarily on the acquisition of first-round picks in the 2022 NHL Entry Draft, and acquired a third first-rounder in agreeing to take goaltender Petr Mrazek from the Toronto Maple Leafs, using those picks in turn to draft Kevin Korchinski, Frank Nazar, and Sam Rinzel. He had also traded Brandon Hagel to the Tampa Bay Lightning in exchange for two first-round picks in subsequent draft years. After the draft, he allowed Dylan Strome and Dominik Kubalik to hit unrestricted free agency. The cumulative effect of these transactions meant that the Blackhawks lost five of their seven highest-scoring forwards from the prior season. Dubbed a "blatant tank-job" by one critic, this was aimed at the 2023 NHL Entry Draft and the possibility of drafting prospective star players Connor Bedard or Matvei Michkov.

References

Living people
Chicago Blackhawks executives
Ice hockey people from Ottawa
Laurentian University alumni
Ottawa Senators
1988 births